Bertram Eugene Warren (June 28, 1902 – June 27, 1991) was an American crystallographer. His studies of X-rays provided much knowledge and understanding of both crystalline and non-crystalline materials. He also worked on changing amorphous solids to a crystalline state.

References

American mineralogists
American crystallographers
1902 births
1991 deaths